Lande is a borough in Østfold county, Norway, located close to the lake Tunevannet and east of E6, which is the national highway going through Sarpsborg.

History

Lande comes out of the Old Norse name Landir; and it means "lands".

Sports
Lande has a local football club that are called Lande IF, which are playing within the 7th division of the Norwegian football league system

Famous people
The Norwegian actor Nils Ole Oftebro was born and raised in Lande.

Schools
There is also an elementary school and junior high school located in Lande, which is called Lande School.

Viken (county)